The Independence Bridge is a bascule-type drawbridge located in Bay City, Michigan.  It carries Truman Parkway over the Saginaw River and was opened in 1976 to replace the earlier Belinda Street Bridge (built in 1893)

References

External links
 Bridge schedule

Bascule bridges in the United States
Bridges completed in 1973
Buildings and structures in Bay County, Michigan
Transportation in Bay County, Michigan
Bay City, Michigan
Road bridges in Michigan
Saginaw River